The 2004 Rushmoor Council election took place on 10 June 2004 to elect members of Rushmoor Borough Council in Hampshire, England. One third of the council was up for election and the Conservative Party stayed in overall control of the council.

After the election, the composition of the council was:
Conservative 24
Liberal Democrat 12
Labour 5
Independent 1

Campaign
14 seats were contested in the election–a third of the council–with the Conservatives defending 9, the Liberal Democrats 3 and Labour 2. Apart from candidates from the Conservative, Liberal Democrat, Labour, Green and English Democrat parties which had stood candidates in the 2003 election, there were also 3 members of the British National Party standing in Rushmoor for the first time. They stood in 3 Farnborough wards, Fernhill, Grange and Mayfield.

2 independent candidates also contested the election. Rosemary Possee stood as an independent in Empress ward, where she had previously served as a councillor for the Conservatives before being de-selected, challenging the official Conservative candidate Patricia Hodge. The other independent candidate, taxi driver Roger Watkins, stood in Wellington ward. Watkins was investigated by the police over claims that some signatures on his nomination form had not been made by the voters themselves; however the police concluded there was no problem and Watkins accused his rivals of dirty tricks.

The contest in Heronwood ward also caused controversy after a leaflet from the Conservative candidate Eddie Poole accused the Liberal Democrat candidate Peter Sandy of "bully boy tactics". Sandy complained to council officials over the leaflet, which he described as a slur, but Poole said he stood by the comment.

Election result
The results saw the Conservatives remain in control of the council with 24 of the 42 seats, but the Liberal Democrats did gain 2 to hold 12 seats. One of the gains came in Manor Park where Liberal Democrat George Paparesti returned to the council 2 years after losing his seat in the 2002 election. The other gain came in Heron Wood, which had been regarded as the safest Labour seat on the council, but saw Liberal Democrat Peter Sandy win by 88 votes defeating the Labour mayor of the council Frank Rust. This meant Labour was reduced to just 5 seats on the council, with the party's candidates having finished fourth in 4 Farnborough wards.

No other seats changed parties, but there were close results in St Marks where the Conservatives held the seat by 12 votes over the Liberal Democrats and in Cove and Southwood where the Liberal Democrats held on by 38 votes over the Conservatives. Rosemary Possee failed to win re-election in Empress ward as an independent, being beaten into third place with the Conservatives holding the seat. Overall turnout in the election was 36.5% up from the 31% seen in 2003 and boosted by an 80% increase in postal votes.

The result in Heron Wood caused controversy with the defeated Labour candidate Frank Rust blaming Tony Blair's support for the Iraq War for his defeat. Meanwhile, the Conservative Member of Parliament for Aldershot Gerald Howarth criticised the winning Liberal Democrat Peter Sandy for not attending the count and said that "It’s a pretty poor show. I do not feel he will be an asset to Heronwood". Peter Sandy, who is disabled, said that he had been unable to attend the count as the battery on his wheelchair was flat and he was defended by his fellow Liberal Democrats.

Ward results

References

2004
2004 English local elections
2000s in Hampshire